Alfred Daniel Alexander Dewdney was an Anglican bishop in the second quarter of the 20th century.

Dewdney was born on 31 March 1863. He was educated at the University of Toronto and ordained in 1887. In his early ministry he held positions at Port Burwell, Durham and Mitchell. He was later Rector of St Alban's Cathedral, Prince Albert and then a lecturer at Emmanuel College, University of Toronto until 1921 when he became Bishop of Keewatin.

Dewdney retired in 1938 and died on 21 April 1945.

See also

References

1863 births
1945 deaths
20th-century Anglican Church of Canada bishops
University of Toronto alumni
Anglican bishops of Keewatin